Vasil Stoyanov Staykov (December 24, 1880 – November 14, 1909) known as Vasil Adzhalarski, was a Macedonian Bulgarian revolutionary, an Internal Macedonian-Adrianople Revolutionary Organization (IMARO) leader of revolutionary bands in the regions of Skopje and Kumanovo.

Biography
Vasil Stoyanov was born in 1880 in the village of Adzhalari, in the Sanjak of Üsküp of the Kosovo Vilayet of the Ottoman Empire (present-day North Macedonia). He received his nickname after this village, which is now known as Miladinovci. In 1901 he moved with his family in Skopje. He entered IMARO and realized a series of tasks for the Organization – he carried post, hid and purchased weapons, but he was arrested and spent two years in the prison Kuršumli An. He got released after an amnesty. In 1903, he became an illegal freedom fighter and at first he was an assistant of the band leader Sande Čolakot in Kumanovo. Later, he entered the revolutionary band of Bobi Stoychev and after that he himself became a leader, in the regions of Skopska Crna Gora and Blatija, under the supervision of Dame Martinov. Adzhalarski distinguished himself from the other freedom fighters with the assassination of several Muslim beys who were suppressing the local Bulgarian inhabitants.

In 1905, Vasil Adzhalarski became a regional leader of the Skopje region. From the end of 1904 until 1908 his revolutionary band conducted more than 10 massive battles with the Turkish military. Adzhalarski also took several successful actions against the armed Serbian propaganda. As a response to the murders of seven Macedonians from the Chair neighborhood by a Serbian band, he killed 9 Serbomans in Brodec, after which the Serbian bands ceased this type of actions. In February 1907, he burned the Han in the village of Sopishte, that served as a base for the traverse of the Serbian bands to the region of Porece.

After the Young Turk Revolution in 1908, he was no more a freedom fighter, but he was killed in an ambush by the Ottoman authorities in Skopje in 1909. His funeral was a reason for a massive protests by the Bulgarians from the region of Skopje against the authorities.

In 1918, Ivan Snegarov wrote the following about Vasil Adzhalarski:

Literature
 "Две надгробни речи; След убийството на Васил Аджаларски; Подробности по убийството на войводата Васил Стоянов", публикувано во "Вести", книга 34, 35, 40, Цариград, 1909 г. The Istanbul Exarchist newspaper "Vesti" about the murder of Vasil Adzhalarski by the Turkish authorities (in Bulgarian) .

References

1880 births
1909 deaths
People from Ilinden Municipality
People from Kosovo vilayet
Members of the Internal Macedonian Revolutionary Organization
Bulgarian revolutionaries
Macedonian Bulgarians
Revolutionaries from the Ottoman Empire